Uğur Aktaş may refer to:

 Uğur Aktaş (footballer) (born 1990), Turkish footballer
 Uğur Aktaş (karateka) (born 1995), Turkish karateka